Campbell Industries or Campbell Machine Company was a shipbuilding company in San Diego, California, most construction was Fishing boats. To support the World War 2 demand for ships Campbell Industries shipyard switched over to military construction and built: US Navy Minesweepers. Campbell Industries was started in 1906 as the Campbell Machine Company as builder and repair yard for tuna seiners. Campbell Machine Company went public in 1960 and was renamed to Campbell Industries. In 1979 the yard was sold again to Marco. In 1982 Marco sold the yard to San Diego Marine Industries, Inc. (not the well known San Diego Marine Construction, Inc.). San Diego Marine Industries, Inc. later became Southwest Marine in 1985. The shipyard closed in 1991 and was later sold, part of the land became San Diego Convention Center. The shipyard was located at 1206 Marina Park Way, San Diego, in San Diego Bay near Embarcadero Marina Park South in the Port of San Diego.

YMS-1-class minesweeper

Campbell Industries built s for the United States Navy in 1942 and 1943. The ships had a crew of 32. The vessels were armed with one 40 mm gun. Twin sister ship see: USS Bobolink (AMS-2)

Notable ships
Notable ships: 
USS YP-279 converted fishing vessel, district patrol craft during World War II. 
USS YP-278 converted fishing vessel. Use as reefer food supplies shipments in the Pacific theater during World War II. 
USS YP-284 converted fishing vessel. Sank in action by Japanese destroyers on 25 October 1942.
USS YP-290 converted fishing vessel, district patrol craft during World War II.  
 Campbell Industries converted some fish boats to US navy minesweepers like the USS Bunting (AMc-7) and USS Reedbird (AMc-30) in 1941
 YP-292 District Patrol Craft, 1937, built as Tuna clipper Azoreana
 Constitution Service, Pioneer Service, Liberty Service, Freedom Service and Independence Service  Tugs for Zapata Marine Service Inc. Both 208-feet a beam of 40 feet and a draft of 14.5 feet, top speed 15 knots with 5,750 hp. Independence Service sank in 30 feet of water on the west side of Puerto Rico and became a total loss, she was raised and scrapped.
 Tuna superseiners 18 ships one Marjorie R, 218 feet long, a beam of 40-feet, up to 1,200 tons frozen fish payload, top speed 17 knots.

See also
California during World War II
Maritime history of California
 Union Iron Works
 Richmond Shipyards
Kneass Boat Works
Pacific Bridge Company

References

American Theater of World War II
1940s in California
American boat builders
Defunct shipbuilding companies of the United States